Jay Sommers (born October 15, 1967) is an American professional stock car racing driver. He competed in the ARCA Permatex SuperCar Series in the late 1980s. After winning the Michigan Lottery in 1988, he used his earnings to bankroll racing endeavors in NASCAR. Sommers eventually raced in the NASCAR Winston Cup Series and NASCAR Busch Series.

He last raced in the Champion Racing Association's JEGS All-Stars Tour.

Racing career
In 1987, Sommers competed in the ARCA Permatex SuperCar Series race at Atlanta International Raceway, finishing 34th after crashing on lap 26.

A year later, at the age of 20, Sommers won one-fifth of a $28.9 million jackpot in the Michigan Lottery, getting $5.8 million. As part of his winnings, Sommers received an annual payment of $290,000, which he used to purchase race cars and equipment from NASCAR team owner Hoss Ellington. He finished fourth in the season-opening ARCA race at Daytona International Speedway, followed by a 31st-place run at Atlanta due to mechanical problems. Rumors eventually surfaced of his death or critical injury, which he attributed to people envious of his lottery success.

In April 1988, he entered a self-owned No. 78 Chevrolet in the Winston Cup race at North Wilkesboro Speedway, but failed to qualify. He retired from the race on lap 280 for overheating issues and finished 37th. Sommers also missed the races at Michigan International Speedway, Richmond Fairgrounds Raceway, and Atlanta.

In 1989, Sommers was encouraged by high school friend John Paganes to let him manage his lottery winnings for the next decade. As part of the deal, Paganes would send Sommers $57,000 each year. Though the money was set to run through 2008, Sommers ultimately lost it, prompting him to sue. Although he won the case on a $887,000 settlement, Sommers had to spend much of it to pay off debts. He eventually became a pizza delivery person and construction worker.

After a four-year retirement from stock car racing, Sommers attempted a return to the sport in 2000, driving late models in the Midwestern United States. In 2003, he competed in the NASCAR Busch Series race at Bristol Motor Speedway, driving the No. 0 for JD Motorsports. After qualifying 33rd, he was involved in a lap 197 crash with Johnny and Tim Sauter, resulting in a 28th-place finish.

In 2005, he won a track championship in Ohio. With the support of car owners Barb and John Stajninger, Sommers later raced in the CRA/JEGS All-Stars Tour, driving the No. 98 car. In the series, he ran two races apiece in 2015 and 2016. Outside of racing, he works as a self-employed marine mechanic.

Motorsports career results

NASCAR
(key) (Bold – Pole position awarded by qualifying time. Italics – Pole position earned by points standings or practice time. * – Most laps led.)

Winston Cup Series

Busch Series

ARCA Permatex SuperCar Series
(key) (Bold – Pole position awarded by qualifying time. Italics – Pole position earned by points standings or practice time. * – Most laps led.)

References

External links
 
 

1967 births
Living people
People from Mount Clemens, Michigan
Sportspeople from Metro Detroit
Racing drivers from Detroit
Racing drivers from Michigan
Lottery winners
ARCA Menards Series drivers
NASCAR drivers